Konstantin Anatolyevich Chuychenko (born 12 July 1965) is a Russian politician, businessman, and lawyer who served as the Minister of Justice since 21 January 2020. Previously, he was Deputy Prime Minister of Russia and Chief of Staff of the Government from 2018 to 2020.

Career 
Born in Lipetsk, Russian SFSR, Soviet Union, Chuychenko graduated from the Law Department of Leningrad State University in 1987 as a fellow student of Dmitry Medvedev.

From 1989 to 1992, Chuychenko served in the KGB. In March 2001, he became the Chief of the Legal Department of Gazprom and since April 2002 he has been a member of the management committee of Gazprom. From 17 January 2003 to July 2004, he was the Chairman of the Board of Directors of the Gazprom Media holding. Since March 2003, he has been a member of the board of directors of the TNT TV network. He is also a member of the board of directors of Gazprom Media, NTV and a shareholder of Gazprom. Since July 2004, he has been an executive director of RosUkrEnergo representing Gazprombank. Since 23 December 2005, he has been a member of the board of directors of Sibneft (now Gazprom Neft). 

On 15 January 2020, he resigned as part of the cabinet, after President Vladimir Putin delivered the Presidential Address to the Federal Assembly. On 21 January, he was appointed Minister of Justice in new Cabinet.

Sanctions
In April 2022 the USA imposed sanctions on Konstantin Chuychenko.

In December 2022 the EU sanctioned Konstantin Chuychenko in relation to the 2022 Russian invasion of Ukraine.

Sanctioned by Japan in January 2023 as a result of the 2022 Russian invasion of Ukraine

Private life 
He is married to Christina Tikhonova, who is a lawyer and has three daughters.

References 

Russian businesspeople
Russian lawyers
KGB officers
Medvedev Administration personnel
Gazprom people
Living people
1965 births
Deputy heads of government of the Russian Federation
21st-century Russian politicians
Justice ministers of Russia
Russian individuals subject to the U.S. Department of the Treasury sanctions
Specially Designated Nationals and Blocked Persons List